The People's Commissariat for State Security  or NKGB,  was the name of the Soviet secret police, intelligence and counter-intelligence force that existed from 3 February 1941 to 20 July 1941, and again in 1943, before being renamed the Ministry for State Security (MGB).

Separate administration 

Changes in Soviet apparatus began in February 1941 with the Presidium of the Supreme Soviet decision. It started with Military Counterintelligence. On 3 February 1941, the 4th Department (Special Section, OO) of GUGB within the NKVD security service responsible for the Red Army military counter-intelligence, consisting of 12 Sections and one Investigation Unit, was separated from the GUGB NKVD. The official liquidation of the OO GUGB and GUGB as organized units within the NKVD was announced on 12 February 1941 by a joint order № 00151/003 of the NKVD and NKGB USSR. The rest of the GUGB was abolished and staff were moved to the newly created People's Commissariat for State Security (NKGB). Departments of the former GUGB were renamed Directorates. For example, the former Foreign Department (INO) became the Foreign Directorate (INU); political police represented by the Secret Political Department (SPO) became the Secret Political Directorate (SPU), and so on.

NKGB tasking 
Based on NKVD and NKGB directive number 782/B265M, from 1 March 1941, the NKGB tasks were:

Conducting intelligence activities abroad;
Battling espionage (on both fronts: counter and offensive);
Battling sabotage and terrorist acts organized by foreign Special Services on USSR territory;
The penetration, and liquidation, of anti-Soviet parties and counter-revolutionary organizations;
Overseeing ideology in Soviet society;
The protection of high party and government officials.

February 1941 organization 
The first head of NKGB was Vsevolod Nikolayevich Merkulov who became People's Commissar of State Security. His first deputy was Ivan Serov, a former Commissar 3rd rank of State Security, and two deputies, Bogdan Kobulov and Mikhail Gribov.

Changes 1941/1943 
The Soviet security organizations were merged in July 1941, after the German invasion, with the NKGB Directorates returned to NKVD as separate units. During 1943 changes NKGB was created again as separate Commissariat. Please look at organization changes below)

These organizational changes were never explained. According to historian John Dziak they may have had something to do with the Soviet occupations of Latvia, Lithuania, Estonia, eastern Poland, part of Romania (Bessarabia and northern Bukovina). Also, the numbers of apprehensions, deportations, executions and establishments of Gulags had quickly grown, which required a reorganization of structures and a boost of manpower in the security administration. Other reasons Dziak states are: the shock caused by the German aggression and the fast progress of their army; and when the Soviet victory in Stalingrad had made prospects of the recovery of previous war losses more likely.

1943 organization

From commissariats to ministries 
In 1946, other changes followed. Existing People's Commissariats were renamed "ministries." People's Commisariat for Internal Affairs (or NKVD) was renamed Ministry of Internal Affairs (Ministerstvo Vnutrennikh Del) or MVD, and the People's Commissariat for State Security was renamed Ministry for State Security (Ministerstvo Gosudarstvennoi Bezopasnosti) or MGB.

See also
 Bibliography of Stalinism and the Soviet Union
Chronology of Soviet secret police agencies
Eastern Bloc politics
RSHA

Notes

References 
Vadim J. Birstein : SMERSH Stalin's Secret Weapon, Soviet military counterintelligence in ww2 
Piotr Kołakowski – NKWD i GRU na ziemiach Polskich 1939–1945 – (Kulisy wywiadu i kontrwywiadu) – Dom wydawniczy Bellona Warszawa 2002 – (NKVD and GRU on Polish soil 1939–1945 [Intelligence counter-intelligence series] Warsaw, 2002)
Norman Polmar, Thomas B Allen – Spy Book: The Encyclopedia of Espionage 1997

Law enforcement agencies of the Soviet Union
Soviet intelligence agencies
Political repression in the Soviet Union
Secret police
1941 establishments in the Soviet Union
1941 disestablishments in the Soviet Union
1943 establishments in the Soviet Union
1946 disestablishments in the Soviet Union
Government agencies established in 1941
Government agencies disestablished in 1941
Government agencies established in 1943
Government agencies disestablished in 1946
State Security